Haji Mohd Nor Othman (born 14 May 1952) was the Member of the Parliament of Malaysia for the Hulu Terengganu constituency in Terengganu from 2008 to 2013, sitting as a member of the United Malays National Organisation (UMNO) party in the ruling Barisan Nasional coalition.

Mohd Nor was elected to Parliament in the 2008 election, but did not re-contest his seat in the 2013 election. Mohd Nor contest under PKR ticket in 2018 in  but only get 969 vote.

Election results

References

Living people
1952 births
People from Terengganu
Members of the Dewan Rakyat
Former United Malays National Organisation politicians
Malaysian people of Malay descent
Malaysian Muslims
Former People's Justice Party (Malaysia) politicians
Malaysian United Indigenous Party politicians